Bhavik Thaker (born 23 October 1982) is an Indian first-class cricketer who plays for Jharkhand.

References

External links
 

1982 births
Living people
Indian cricketers
Jharkhand cricketers
People from Bhavnagar